Keenan Stadium, is a multi-purpose stadium and an International Cricket Stadium in Jamshedpur, India.  It is currently used mostly for cricket and football matches. It is also known as a venue for archery.

The stadium is named after John Lawrence Keenan a former general manager of the Tata Steel. The stadium is situated in Northern Town area of Bistupur and is owned by Tata Steel. It has a capacity of 19,000 people.

History 
Since being built in 1939 the ground has hosted Ranji Trophy matches for the Bihar now Jharkhand cricket team. The venue staged its first international match in December 1983 when West Indies beat India in a One Day International.

The ground has staged a further nine One Day Internationals, of which India won but one, the most recent in April 2006 when England beat India by five wickets.

Sourav Ganguly scored a 100 to help India win its only match here. Former Indian captain MS Dhoni has played many matches for Jharkhand in this stadium. He spent much time in this stadium in his early days when JSCA stadium was not built in Ranchi, and also featured in M.S. Dhoni: The Untold Story, the biopic on Dhoni.

Episode 
This stadium became infamous for the crowd turning violent and throwing crackers on field during India against West Indies match in 2002/03.

List of Centuries

Key
 * denotes that the batsman was not out.
 Inns. denotes the number of the innings in the match.
 Balls denotes the number of balls faced in an innings.
 NR denotes that the number of balls was not recorded.
 Parentheses next to the player's score denotes his century number at Edgbaston.
 The column title Date refers to the date the match started.
 The column title Result refers to the player's team result

One Day Internationals

List of Five Wicket Hauls

Key

One Day Internationals

References

External links
 Cricinfo
 cricketarchive

Cricket grounds in Jharkhand
Multi-purpose stadiums
Sport in Jamshedpur
Sports venues in Jharkhand
Sports venues completed in 1939
1939 establishments in India
20th-century architecture in India